The Talgat Bigeldinov Military Institute of the Air Defence Forces (Keńes Odaǵynyń eki márte Batyry T.IA.Bigeldınov atyndaǵy Áýe qorǵanys kushteriniń Áskerı ınstıtýty) is a specialized military academy which helps train future servicemen of the Kazakh Air Defense Forces. Established in 1974 as the Aktobe Higher Civil Aviation School (AVLUGA), it originally served the purpose of training specialists (mainly pilots) in the field of aviation. Until 1996, the AVLUGA served under this name and was renamed after the only two-time Kazakh Hero of the Soviet Union Talgat Begeldinov in July 2003. As of 2013, the institute has produced over 160 lieutenants in the air defence forces, and has trained cadets from foreign countries such as Hungary and Afghanistan.

References

External links 

Educational institutions established in 1974
Military academies of Kazakhstan
Air force academies
Military academies of the Soviet Union
Soviet Air Forces education and training